The Preamble to the Constitution of the People's Socialist Republic of Albania is a brief introductory statement of the Constitution's fundamental purposes and guiding principles of the Socialist People's Republic of Albania.

Preamble

References

Preambles of Constitutions of Albania